Aces Go Places 3, also known under the titles Aces Go Places 3 - Our Man from Bond Street and Mad Mission III, is a 1984 Hong Kong action comedy film directed by Tsui Hark as the third installment in the Aces Go Places film series. The film starts in Paris, where King Kong (Sam Hui) is recruited by Queen Elizabeth and a James Bond-like character to retrieve one of the Crown Jewels which has been stolen and is located in a Hong Kong Police Headquarters vault. Richard Kiel spoofs his role as "Jaws" from the James Bond film series.

Aces Go Places 3 was the highest-grossing film in Hong Kong on its release in 1984 and was the highest-grossing film in the series. The film was released in an English-language dub titled Mad Mission 3 which had scenes cut and altered from the original film. Tsui had previously appeared in the first two films in cameos.

Cast
 Sam Hui as King Kong
 Karl Maka as Albert Au
 Sylvia Chang as Nancy Ho
 Ricky Hui as Puffer Fish
 Peter Graves as agent Tom Collins
 John Shum as Police chief
 Jean Mersant as Mr. Bond
 Richard Kiel as Big G
 Tsuneharu Sugiyama as Oddjob
 Huguette Funfrock as Queen of England

Production
Aces Go Places 3 riffs off the plots of the James Bond series and features cameos from actors in various English-language spy features. These include Peter Graves from the Mission: Impossible television series and Richard Kiel who played Jaws in The Spy Who Loved Me and Moonraker. The film also features a character resembling Oddjob. Several sources erroneously report that the character of "Mr Bond", the James Bond-like British secret agent, was played by Neil Connery, Sean Connery's younger brother. The character was actually played by Jean Mersant, a French Sean Connery impersonator.

Release
Aces Go Places 3 was released on 26 January 1984. The film was a success with audiences, becoming the highest-grossing film in Hong Kong in the year end box office and was the highest-grossing film in the Aces Go Places series. An English-dubbed version of the film was released under the title Mad Mission 3. This version removes about 20 minutes of footage including scenes from the original film with Karl Maka's Albert, the baby and a maid and scenes with Sylvia Chang's character, Ho, in the hospital. This version includes additional comedy scenes with Peter Graves' character.

Reception
Allmovie gave the film three stars out of five, noting that the plot for Aces Go Places 3 was "stronger than usual for the series" and "that film's juvenile sense of humor might put off viewers in search of more sophisticated fare, but many others are likely to find the movie too colorful and exciting to be denied." John Charles, author Hong Kong Filmography 1977-1997 awarded the film a six out of ten rating finding the scenes involving Sylvia Chang and Karl Maka were "tiresome and consist almost exclusively of situations from old sitcoms".  In his book Horror and Science Fiction Film IV, Donald C Willis referred to the film as a "lively, routine action comedy."

See also
List of Hong Kong films of 1984

Notes

References

External links
 
 

1984 films
1980s action comedy films
1984 martial arts films
Hong Kong action comedy films
Hong Kong martial arts comedy films
Hong Kong sequel films
1980s crime comedy films
1980s spy comedy films
1980s Cantonese-language films
Films directed by Tsui Hark
Films set in Hong Kong
Films shot in Hong Kong
Films set in Paris
Films shot in Paris
Hong Kong detective films
Parody films based on James Bond films
1980s Hong Kong films